In enzymology, a glutaryl-7-aminocephalosporanic-acid acylase is an enzyme that catalyzes the chemical reaction

(7R)-7-(4-carboxybutanamido)cephalosporanate + H2O  (7R)-7-aminocephalosporanate + glutarate

Thus, the two substrates of this enzyme are (7R)-7-(4-carboxybutanamido)cephalosporanate and H2O, whereas its two products are (7R)-7-aminocephalosporanate and glutarate.

This enzyme belongs to the family of hydrolases, those acting on carbon-nitrogen bonds other than peptide bonds, specifically in linear amides.  The systematic name of this enzyme class is (7R)-7-(4-carboxybutanamido)cephalosporanate amidohydrolase. Other names in common use include 7beta-(4-carboxybutanamido)cephalosporanic acid acylase, cephalosporin C acylase, glutaryl-7-ACA acylase, CA, GCA, GA, cephalosporin acylase, glutaryl-7-aminocephalosporanic acid acylase, and GL-7-ACA acylase.  This enzyme participates in penicillin and cephalosporin biosynthesis.

References

 
 
 
 
 
 
 

EC 3.5.1
Enzymes of unknown structure